Lewis Cleale is an American theatre actor and singer from Houlton, Maine.

Early life and education
A graduate of the University of Miami's Frost School of Music (where he has been named Distinguished Alumnus) and of the Burt Reynolds Dinner Theatre,<ref name=Panarello>Joseph F. Panarello, "BWW INTERVIEWS: Lewis Cleale: THE FANTASTICKS' 'Man In Black'", 7 July 2009, BroadwayWorld.com, accessed 2 June 2010.</ref> Cleale's big break came when he was cast in a European tour of Oklahoma!, in which he was noticed by Mary Rodgers, who recommended him for a Los Angeles production of State Fair.

Career

Cleale made his Broadway debut in the 1995 Johnny Burke revue Swinging on a Star, for which he received a Drama Desk Award nomination as Outstanding Featured Actor in a Musical. Additional Broadway credits include the 1996 revival of Once Upon a Mattress with Sarah Jessica Parker, the ill-fated 2002 Michel Legrand musical Amour, and the 2005 hit Spamalot. Cleale also appeared in the popular revue I Love New York which was done at the Rainbows and Stars room along with Bryan Batt, Janet Metz and Heather MacRae. Off-Broadway, he has appeared in Call Me Madam opposite Tyne Daly and A New Brain with Malcolm Gets and Kristin Chenoweth for Lincoln Center Theater.

From September 2008 through March 2009 and from June 2009 through March 2010, Cleale played El Gallo in the Off-Broadway revival of The Fantasticks at the Jerry Orbach Theater on 51st Street and Broadway. Cleale left that show to be an understudy for Sondheim on Sondheim. Cleale credits Sondheim as being one of the reasons he went into acting: 

In 2011, Cleale starred in the original Broadway cast members of The Book of Mormon, playing roles such as Elder Price's Dad, Joseph Smith and others. He is still in the show as of April 2022.

In Washington, D.C., Cleale portrayed John Adams in 1776 at Ford's Theatre and Giorgio in Stephen Sondheim's Passion at the Signature Theatre, for which he won the 1997 Helen Hayes Award for "Outstanding Lead Actor in a Resident Musical". In May 2009, he played the lead in the new musical Giant, based on Edna Ferber's novel of the same name, at the Signature Theatre.

Cleale has also performed leading roles at Goodspeed Opera, George Street Playhouse, Cleveland Opera, Actors Theatre of Louisville, Long Beach Civic Light Opera, and The Muny in St. Louis.

Tours and recordings
In 1999-2000, Cleale portrayed Joe Gillis opposite Petula Clark's Norma Desmond in the national tour of Sunset Boulevard, and in 2002 went on the road again as Lieut. Joe Cable in South Pacific opposite Robert Goulet.

Cleale's recordings include William Finn's Infinite Joy, Adam Guettel's Myths and Hymns, the RCA Victor anthology Great Musicals, and the original cast albums of Once Upon a Mattress, Swinging on a Star, Call Me Madam, and Amour''.

References

External links
 

American male musical theatre actors
American tenors
University of Miami alumni
People from Houlton, Maine
Year of birth missing (living people)
Living people